Changlong station is a Metro station of Shenzhen Metro Line 5. It opened on 22 June 2011. This station is in the middle of Jihua Road.

Station layout

Exits

References

External links
 Shenzhen Metro Changlong Station (Chinese)
 Shenzhen Metro Changlong Station (English)

Shenzhen Metro stations
Railway stations in Guangdong
Longgang District, Shenzhen
Railway stations in China opened in 2011